Bad Women is a 2001 Italian prison-drama film directed by Fabio Conversi.

Cast
 Giovanna Mezzogiorno as Francesca
 Ángela Molina as Nunzia
 Ana Fernández as Candela
 Sabina Began as Patrizia
 Rosa Pianeta as Botti

References

External links
 

2001 films
Italian drama films
2000s prison drama films
2001 drama films
2000s Italian films